Bilal Amarzagouio (born 29 November 1992) is a Dutch footballer who plays as a defender or midfielder for Al Ittihad (Salalah).

Career

Amarzagouio started his career with Dutch ninth division side . In 2011, he signed for Papendorp in the Dutch seventh division. In 2012, Amarzagouio signed for Dutch fifth division club Sparta Nijkerk, helping them achieve promotion to the Dutch fourth division. Before the 2017 season, he signed for CRA in Morocco, where he said, “A Spanish trainer came with a completely different vision. He preferred to make money from other players, we were told that by the board. It was one of the reasons I stopped playing. I was allowed to play in the cup every now and then. The worst part is that you don't get a chance at all." In 2018, Amarzagouio signed for Dutch fourth division team ASV De Dijk. Before the second half of 2020–21, he signed for Al Ittihad (Salalah) in Oman.

References

External links
 Bilal Amarzagouio at playmakerstats.com
 

Dutch footballers
Expatriate footballers in Oman
Living people
Association football defenders
Association football midfielders
Expatriate footballers in Morocco
Dutch expatriate footballers
1992 births
Sparta Nijkerk players
ASV De Dijk players
OFC Oostzaan players
Dutch expatriate sportspeople in Morocco